In United States federal banking legislation, the Phelan Act of 1920, sponsored by Sen. James D. Phelan (D) of California, authorized progressive discount rates for any Federal Reserve District bank that borrowed relatively large amounts from its Reserve bank.  

The FED district bank was given the option to enforce or deny the provision.  In FED districts that accepted progressive rates, each member bank was given a line of credit or normal re-discount.  This measure helped the banks with the difficult transition from wartime to peacetime.  It bought member banks time to reorganize and renegotiate loans given to large defense contracting firms that would no longer be manufacturing high priced war munitions and material meant for sale to the government.  With the government no longer purchasing, major firms would no longer be in a position to pay back large loans, and thus the banks that had lent them money to finance heavy production needed Federal assistance.  

1920 in American law
1920 in the United States
United States federal banking legislation